USS Helen Baughman (SP-1292) was a United States Navy patrol vessel in commission from 1917 to 1918.

Helen Baughman was built as a civilian schooner of the same name in 1894 by Bowns at Nanticoke, Maryland. In August 1917, the U.S. Navy acquired her from her owner, the Maryland State Conservation Commission, for use as a section patrol boat during World War I. She was commissioned as USS Helen Baughman (SP-1292).

Assigned to the 5th Naval District and based at Deale, Maryland, Helen Baughman served on patrol duties on the Chesapeake Bay for the rest of World War I, cruising Herring Bay, Tangier Sound, and surrounding areas.

The Navy returned Helen Baughman to the Conservation Commission on 27 November 1918.

References
 
 SP-1292 Helen Baughman at Department of the Navy Naval History and Heritage Command Online Library of Selected Images: U.S. Navy Ships: -- Listed by Hull Number: "SP" #s and "ID" #s -- World War I Era Patrol Vessels and other Acquired Ships and Craft numbered from SP-1200 through SP-1299
 NavSource Online: Section Patrol Craft Photo Archive Helen Baughman (SP 1292)

Maritime history of Maryland
Chesapeake Bay boats
Schooners of the United States Navy
Patrol vessels of the United States Navy
World War I patrol vessels of the United States
Ships built in Maryland
1894 ships